Pyotr Alexandrovich Blinov (Pekshur village, Uvinsky District, Udmurtia  – near Smolensk, January 7, 1942) was a Soviet Udmurt writer and journalist.

His most famous work was the novel Wanting to Live (Улэм потэ, Russian ). He died in battle during World War II.

References

External links
 Biography in Russian (with photo)

1913 births
1942 deaths
Soviet journalists
Blinov, Pyotr
Udmurt people